The 1985 Women's Junior World Handball Championship was the fifth edition of the tournament which took place in South Korea from 19 to 30 October 1985.

Fifteen teams competed in the competition from three continents with only Spain debuting in the competition. Ivory Coast was meant to compete in the competition but had to withdraw. The gold medal went to the defending champions in the Soviet Union who claimed their fourth title after defeating South Korea by three goals in the final. Poland finished in third after defeating East Germany in second overtime.

First round

Group A

Group B

Group C

Group D

Second round

Group I

Group II

Thirteenth place

Placement matches

Eleventh place game

Ninth place game

Seventh place game

Fifth place game

Third place game

Final

Ranking
The final rankings from the 1985 edition:

References

External links 

Women's Junior World Handball
Women's Junior World Handball Championship, 1985
1985
Junior Handball
Women's handball in South Korea